William Loko (born February 5, 1972 in Sully-sur-Loire, France) is a former professional footballer who played as a striker.

External links
William Loko profile at chamoisfc79.fr

1972 births
Living people
French footballers
Association football forwards
Stade de Reims players
Chamois Niortais F.C. players
Stade Malherbe Caen players
Ligue 2 players

Association football midfielders
Wasquehal Football players